Sirius: The Dog Star is a 2004 anthology of science fiction/fantasy short-stories revolving around dogs. Edited by Martin H. Greenberg and Alexander Potter, it was published by DAW.

Contents

References

2004 anthologies
Martin H. Greenberg anthologies
DAW Books books
Books about dogs